Francisco Javier "Saverio" Moriones (born 27 June 1943) is an Italian actor and voice actor.

Biography
Born in Rome to a Spanish father and an Italian mother, Moriones began his career on the children's television show Giocagiò until its cancellation in 1969 but he is more known as a voice dubber. Because of his Spanish origin, Moriones often dubs characters with Hispanic accents and ethnicities. Some of the actors he dubs includes Richard Dean Anderson as the title character of the show MacGyver as well as Joe Pesci in the first two films of the Home Alone franchise.

Moriones is also the regular Italian voice dubbing actor of Danny Trejo. In his animated roles, he voiced Roadkill in the Italian-Language dub of Rango as well as Chicharrón in the Italian-Language dub of Coco. He has even dubbed Slinky Dog in Toy Story 4 following the death of Piero Tiberi in 2013.

Personal life
Moriones was once married to Elisabetta Bonino, whom he met on the set of Giocagiò. Together, they have one daughter, Amparo and a son, Simon. He also has an additional daughter named Arianna with his current wife Germana Tucci.

Filmography

Television
Giocagiò (1966–1969)

Dubbing roles

Animation
Roadkill in Rango
Chicharrón in Coco
Costa Rican President in South Park
Slinky Dog in Toy Story 4

Live action
Angus MacGyver in  MacGyver
Harry Lime in Home Alone
Harry Lime in Home Alone 2: Lost in New York
Johnny Baca in Con Air
Slim in Bubble Boy
El Jefe in XXX
Mario in La Linea
The Chief in Fanboys
Cuchillo in Predators
Jacob's grandfather in Breaking Wind
Goldberg in Death Race 3: Inferno
Guerrero De La Cruz in Dead in Tombstone
Isador "Machete" Cortez in Machete Kills
Howling Mad Murdock in The A-Team
Harry Klein in Derrick
Blake in Glengarry Glen Ross
Jack McCoy in Law & Order
Denny Crane in Boston Legal (Ep. 16–101)
Richard Thornburg in Die Hard
Henry Pope in Prison Break
Ed Tom Bell in No Country for Old Men
Roland Tembo in The Lost World: Jurassic Park
John Keller in Transformers
Chester Phillips in Captain America: The First Avenger

Video games
Raul Alfonso Tejada in Fallout: New Vegas

References

External links

1943 births
Living people
Male actors from Rome
Italian male voice actors
Italian male television actors
20th-century Italian male actors
21st-century Italian male actors
Italian people of Spanish descent